Taekwondo at the Pacific Games has been contested since 1995 when it was introduced for the tenth edition at Papeete, Tahiti. Women's taekwondo was added in 1999 for the games held in Guam. 

The men's and women's individual competitions have eight weight classes each in accordance with World Taekwondo classifications as of 2019. There are also teams events for men's and women's competition. 

Taekwondo has been included in the Pacific Mini Games, starting with the ninth edition at Wallis and Futuna in 2013.

Pacific Games
The taekwondo weight classes contested at each Pacific Games are listed in the table below. Flag icons and three letter country code indicate the nationality of the gold medal winner of an event, where this information is known; otherwise an (X) is used. Moving the cursor onto a country code with a dotted underline will reveal the name of the gold medal winner. A dash (–) indicates a weight division that was not contested.

Men's events

Women's events

Pacific Mini Games

Men

Women

References

 
Pacific Games